Born to Die: The Paradise Edition is the reissue of American singer-songwriter Lana Del Rey's major-label debut studio album Born to Die (2012). It was released on November 9, 2012, by Interscope and Polydor Records. Released ten months after the original, The Paradise Edition features eight newly recorded tracks, which were simultaneously made available on the standalone extended play Paradise (2012). Although having worked with several producers for each record, Emile Haynie and Rick Nowels are the only producers whose contributions are featured on both discs.

The Paradise Edition performed moderately on international record charts in Europe, where it charted separately from Born to Die and Paradise. While the project was not directly supported by singles of its own, the tracks "Ride" and "Burning Desire" were released from Paradise on September 25, 2012, and March 13, 2013, while "Dark Paradise" was serviced from Born to Die on March 1, 2013. A remix of the track "Summertime Sadness" from Born to Die, produced by Cedric Gervais, was released independently from either project on July 11, 2013; it was later included on select reissues of The Paradise Edition after experiencing success on record charts worldwide.

Background and release

Del Rey released her second studio album and major-label debut Born to Die in January 2012 by Interscope Records, Polydor Records, and Stranger Records. It debuted at number two on the U.S. Billboard 200 with first-week sales of 77,000 copies; in doing so, it became the highest opening week for a major-label debut by a female artist since Dream with Me (2011) by Jackie Evancho entered at number two in the United States. In July, Del Rey expressed her intentions release an expanded version of Born to Die subtitled The Paradise Edition, which was initially expected to contain seven newly recorded tracks to supplement the original record. Del Rey unveiled its cover in September, in which she is photographed in a beige-colored one-piece swimsuit standing before a tropical background, and elaborated that the reissue would contain the fifteen-track deluxe version of Born to Die and nine previously unreleased songs.

The final product was first released on November 9 in Australia, and was later made available on November 13 in the United States. The Paradise Edition was packaged as a two-disc product in its physical variation, while a digital version was serviced to online music stores. The newly recorded material was simultaneously made available on the standalone extended play Paradise (2012). The Paradise Edition was released in vinyl record packaging on November 20; it came with the vinyl for Paradise, and designated a slipcase to hold a separately-purchased vinyl of Born to Die. A limited edition box set of the project was released on December 4, 2012; it contained the physical version of the record, an eight-track remix disc, a six-music video DVD, four printed photographs, and a two-track vinyl record with remixes of "Blue Velvet".

New material

The eight tracks appended on The Paradise Edition exemplify a "cinematic" musical style first introduced through Born to Die, and incorporates frequent electric guitar and piano instrumentation like the preceding record. The newly recorded material employs more profane language than the original record, particularly with descriptions of sexual encounters. The second disc commences with the track "Ride", which Tom Breihan from Stereogum described as a "string-drenched ballad" that saw Del Rey exploring the "crossover-soul-pop" musical styles that British singer Adele is commonly associated with. The follow-up track "American" heavily integrates Americana references in its lyrics, and employs minimalist piano and string instrumentation that Sian Watson from Associated Press felt placed the "smoky, effortless vocals" at the forefront of the song. "Cola" begins with the lines "My pussy tastes like Pepsi-Cola / My eyes are wide like cherry pies", which PopMatters Enio Chiola felt solidified the recurring concept of "a girl trying to find her father in her elder lovers" that unifies the additional tracks.

The fourth track "Body Electric" was distinguished by Jesse Cataldo of Slant Magazine for its string instrumentation, which he described as a "pre-established atmospheric skeletion" given the frequency of their usage on the disc. "Blue Velvet" is a cover version of the 1950s track written by Bernie Wayne and Lee Moris, and was interpreted by Chiola as a "romantic tribute of lovelorn and loss." On the track "Gods & Monsters", Carl Williott from Idolator noted that Del Rey delivered the lyrics "I was an angel / Looking to get fucked hard" and "Fuck yeah, give it to me / This is heaven, what I truly want" with a "sultry numbness" that avoided coming across as a generic song about sex. "Yayo" first appeared on Del Rey's debut studio album Lana Del Ray (2010); David Edwards of Drowned in Sound described the track as "stammeringly beautiful", and directed his commentary towards the genuine emotions of "a heartbeat away from collapse." According to Williott, the eighth and final track "Bel Air" is a "melancholy waltz" that notably employs a "forest nymph chant" during its refrain.

Promotion
"Ride" was originally announced as the lead single from The Paradise Edition, although the track was later recognized as an offering from the standalone extended play Paradise; it was premiered and released through the iTunes Store on September 25, 2012. The song respectively peaked at numbers 21 and 26 on the U.S. Billboard Rock Songs and Adult Alternative Songs component charts, and performed sporadically across international singles charts. After The Paradise Edition was released, "Dark Paradise" was serviced as the sixth single from Born to Die on March 1, 2013, and reached the lower ends of select European singles charts.

Commercial performance
The Paradise Edition charted together with Born to Die on the U.S. Billboard 200, and consequently assisted its parent record in rising from number 79 to number 37 with release-week sales of 16,000 copies. Having charted separately from Born to Die and Paradise throughout much of Europe, the record performed moderately on international record charts. It charted at number four on the Polish Albums Chart, and respectively reached numbers 6 and 15 on the Belgian Ultratop charts in Flanders and Wallonia. The project peaked at number 15 on the Dutch MegaCharts, and appeared at number 22 on both The Official Finnish Charts and the Swedish Sverigetopplistan. Although a specific charting position was not released, The Paradise Edition was certified gold by the Syndicat National de l'Édition Phonographique in France. In Oceania, it reached number 17 on the Australian ARIA Charts, and was acknowledged with a platinum certification in the country. The project also reached number six on the Official New Zealand Music Chart, where it was eventually certified platinum.

Track listing
Credits adapted from the liner notes of Born to Die: The Paradise Edition.

Notes
  signifies a co-producer
  signifies a vocal producer
  signifies an additional producer
  signifies a remixer

Personnel
Credits adapted from the liner notes of Born to Die: The Paradise Edition.

Disc 1
Performance credits

 Lana Del Rey – vocals 
 Emilie Bauer-Mein – backing vocals 
 James Bauer-Mein – backing vocals 
 Lenha Labelle – French vocals 
 David Sneddon – backing vocals 
 Hannah Robinson – backing vocals 
 Maria Vidal – additional vocals 

Instruments

 Patrik Berger – guitar, bass guitar, percussion, synthesizer, sampler, drum programming 
 Jeff Bhasker – guitar ; keyboards ; additional keyboards ; additional strings 
 Chris Braide – guitar, acoustic piano, strings, drum programming 
 Pelle Hansen – cello 
 Emile Haynie – drums ; keyboards ; additional keyboards ; guitar 
 Dan Heath – flute , additional strings 
 Erik Holm – viola 
 Liam Howe – additional keyboards, programming 
 Devrim Karaoglu – additional synthesizer, orchestral drums ; additional pads 
 Brent Kolatalo – additional drums 
 Ken Lewis - additional vocal noises ; additional drums 
 Rick Nowels – guitar ; additional strings ; keyboards 
 Dean Reid – pads 
 Al Shux – guitar, bass guitar, keyboards, programming 
 Sacha Skarbek – omnichord 
 Fredrik Syberg – violin 
 Patrick Warren – chamberlain strings ; additional strings ; guitar, keyboards ; strings, secondary strings 

Technical and production

 Carl Bagge – string arrangements 
 Patrik Berger – production 
 Jeff Bhasker – co-production , additional production 
 Chris Braide – production 
 Lorenzo Cosi – engineering 
 Mike Daly – vocal production 
 John Davis – mastering 
 Duncan Fuller – mixing assistant 
 Chris Galland – mixing assistant 
 Larry Gold – string arrangements, conductor 
 Dan Grech-Marguerat – mixing 
 Emile Haynie – production 
 Dan Heath – string arrangements, conductor 
 Liam Howe – co-production 
 Brent Kolatalo – additional recording 
 Erik Madrid – mixing assistant 
 Manny Marroquin – mixing 
 Kieron Menzies – engineering 
 The Nexus – vocal production 
 Rick Nowels – co-production ; vocal production 
 Justin Parker – vocal production ; additional production 
 Robopop – production, mixing 
 Al Shux – production, vocal production 
 Steve Tirpak – string assistant

Disc 2
Performance credits
 Lana Del Rey – vocals ; backing vocals 

Instruments

 James Gadson – drums 
 Emile Haynie – drums ; additional keyboards 
 Dan Heath – percussion ; horns ; keyboards ; strings ; piano 
 Devrim Karaoglu – drums 
 Jason Lader – bass guitar 
 Tim Larcombe – keyboards, guitar, drums 
 The Larry Gold Orchestra – strings 
 Songa Lee – violin 
 Kieron Menzies – drum programming 
 Rick Nowels – synthesizer ; keyboards ; bass guitar, acoustic guitar, drums ; piano, mellotron, strings 
 Tim Pierce – electric guitar ; slide guitar 
 Zac Rae – piano, keyboards 
 Kathleen Sloan – violin 
 Patrick Warren – electric guitar, synthesizer, piano ; strings, glockenspiel, brass ; organ ; dulcitone, bells, Optigan, mellotron 

Technical and production

 Graham Archer – vocal engineering 
 Ben Baptie – mixing assistant 
 Spencer Burgess Jr. – recording assistant 
 Nikki Calvert – engineering 
 Jeremy Cochise Ball – mixing 
 John Davis – mastering 
 DK – co-production 
 Tom Elmhirst – mixing 
 Chris Garcia – additional recording ; recording 
 Larry Gold – string arrangements 
 Emile Haynie – co-production ; production ; additional production 
 Dan Heath – string arrangements ; orchestral arrangements ; production ; engineering 
 Jason Lader – recording 
 Tim Larcombe – production 
 Eric Lynn – recording assistant 
 Kieron Menzies – recording, mixing 
 Rick Nowels – production 
 Sean Oakley – recording assistant 
Robert Orton - mixing 
 Tucker Robinson – string recording ; engineering 
 Jeff Rothschild – mixing 
 Rick Rubin – production 
 Andrew Scheps – mixing 
 Peter Stanislaus – mixing 
 Jordan Stilwell – additional recording

Charts

Weekly charts

Year-end charts

Certifications

Release history

References

2012 albums
Albums produced by Jeff Bhasker
Albums produced by Emile Haynie
Albums produced by Rick Nowels
Albums produced by Al Shux
Albums produced by Rick Rubin
Interscope Records albums
Lana Del Rey albums
Polydor Records albums
Reissue albums
Interscope Geffen A&M Records albums
Indie pop albums by American artists
Baroque pop albums
Sadcore albums
Trip hop albums by American artists